The 2018 Asian Airgun Championships were held in Sheikh Sabah Al-Ahmad Olympic Shooting Complex Kuwait City, Kuwait between November 2 and 12, 2018.

Medal summary

Men

Women

Mixed

Medal table

References 
General
 ISSF Results Overview

Specific

External links 
 Official Results

Asian Shooting Championships
Shooting
Kuwait City
Asian